Marek Mazanec (born 18 July 1991) is a Czech professional ice hockey goaltender currently playing for Mountfield HK of the Czech Extraliga (ELH). Mazanec has previously played for the Nashville Predators, who selected him in the sixth round, 179th overall, of the 2012 NHL Entry Draft.

Playing career
Mazanec played at the junior level with IHC Písek, before at 14 moving to Plzeň, where he continued his junior career. Beginning in the 2009–10 season, he played at the senior level in the professional Czech Extraliga.

On 3 May 2013, the Nashville Predators of the NHL signed Mazanec to a two-year, entry-level contract. He began the 2013–14 season with the Predators' American Hockey League (AHL) affiliate, the Milwaukee Admirals.

On 8 November 2013, Mazanec made his NHL debut with Nashville, playing 51:37 and allowing two goals on 24 shots after replacing starter Carter Hutton in a game against the Winnipeg Jets. After 10 games with the Predators he posted a .932 save percentage and was named NHL Rookie of the month for November.

On 20 July 2017, Mazanec agreed to a one-year extension to remain with the Predators for his last restricted year under contract. However under a month later, the Predators and Mazanec agreed not to fulfil his contract, allowing him to leave North America and agree to a one-year contract with Slovak outfit, Slovan Bratislava of the Kontinental Hockey League (KHL), on 14 August 2017.

On 6 December 2017, the New York Rangers signed Mazanec and immediately assigned him to their AHL affiliate, the Hartford Wolf Pack.

In the following 2018–19 season, Mazanec appeared in 20 games for the Wolf Pack posting a record of 7–8–3 along with a .903 save percentage and 3.01 GAA. He was recalled to the Rangers on two occasions however did not feature in a game. On 12 February 2019, the Rangers traded Mazanec to the Vancouver Canucks in exchange for a seventh-round draft pick in 2020. As the Canucks backup, he did not feature in a game, before he was sent for the remainder of the season to AHL affiliate, the Utica Comets.

As an impending unrestricted free agent from the Canucks, Mazanec opted to return to his native Czech Republic, agreeing to a two-year contract with Mountfield HK of the ELH on 27 April 2019. At the 2019 NHL Entry Draft, the Canucks traded Mazanec's rights, 2019 third-round draft pick and a 2020 conditional first-round pick to the Tampa Bay Lightning in exchange for J. T. Miller on 22 June 2019.

Career statistics

Regular season and playoffs

International

References

External links

1991 births
Living people
Czech ice hockey goaltenders
Hartford Wolf Pack players
Milwaukee Admirals players
Nashville Predators draft picks
Nashville Predators players
Sportspeople from Písek
HC Plzeň players
HC Slovan Bratislava players
Utica Comets players
Czech expatriate ice hockey players in Canada
Czech expatriate ice hockey players in the United States
Stadion Hradec Králové players